The Junior League World Series is a baseball tournament for children aged 12, 13, and 14 years old. The tournament is held annually at Heritage Park in Taylor, Michigan. It is patterned after the Little League World Series, which was named for the World Series in Major League Baseball.

The Junior League World Series is one of eleven tournaments sponsored by Little League International. Each of them brings baseball or softball teams from around the world together in one of four age divisions. The tournament structure for each division's World Series is similar to that used for the Little League Baseball World Series.

Tournament history

The tournament started in 1981, and was originally created for 13-year-old players competing in Little League's Senior League division (which at the time included 13- to 15-year-olds). In 1999, Little league spun a separate Junior League division off from the Senior League division, which included 13- and 14-year-old players (currently, 15-year-olds are also eligible if their date of birth is after May 1 of the current season). Unlike the Little League World Series — which has sixteen regions (eight in the U.S. and eight international) — the Junior League World Series has only twelve regions. The twelve regional champions are divided into two pools (USA and International). The two best teams from each pool advance to the semi-finals, to determine the US champion and the International champion. The semi-final winners play for the World Series Championship. The losing teams face off in classification games.

Originally only US teams played in the tournament. As time progressed, however, international teams began to participate. The Puerto Rico Region was established as the first international region, in 1982. The Mexico Region followed in 1986, the Canada Region in 1988, the first European team in 1990, and the Australia Region in 2016. Prior to 2000, the Mexico and Puerto Rico regions each received automatic berths into the tournament. In 2000, a Latin America Region was formed and included the former Mexico and Puerto Rico regions. Starting in 2004, the Mexico Region now receives an automatic berth to the tournament in even-numbered years, while the Puerto Rico Region receives an automatic berth in odd-numbered years. (Each year, the teams from the region without an automatic berth instead participate in the Latin America Region tournament.) From 1985–89 the Michigan state champion received a slot as the Host Team. In 2018, the Host Team was brought back to the tournament as the sixth United States region.

The six United States regions are:
Central
East
Host
Southeast
Southwest
West

The six International regions are:
Asia–Pacific
Australia
Canada
Europe–Africa
Latin America
Mexico or Puerto Rico

List of champions

Championships won by country/state

See also
List of Little League World Series champions by division

Footnotes

External links
Junior League World Series. City of Taylor official website
Little League homepage. Little League official website
Junior League World Series Photographs. Official photographers of the Junior League World Series.

 
Baseball in Michigan
Sports competitions in Michigan
Sports in Wayne County, Michigan
Annual sporting events in the United States
Recurring sporting events established in 1981